Bucculatrix orophilella is a moth in the family Bucculatricidae. It was described by Jacques Nel in 1999. It is found in France.

References

Natural History Museum Lepidoptera generic names catalog

Bucculatricidae
Moths described in 1999
Moths of Europe